John McFall may refer to:

John McFall (athlete) (born 1981), British Paralympic sprinter
John McFall, Baron McFall of Alcluith (born 1944), British politician
John J. McFall (1918–2006), former member of the US House of Representatives for California